is a Japanese cross-country mountain biker. At the 2008 Summer Olympics, she competed in the women's cross-country event, finishing in 20th place.  At the 2012 Summer Olympics, she competed in the Women's cross-country at Hadleigh Farm, finishing in 20th place again. In October 2012, she announced she would be retiring as a professional cyclist.

References

Cross-country mountain bikers
Japanese female cyclists
1979 births
Living people
Olympic cyclists of Japan
Cyclists at the 2008 Summer Olympics
Cyclists at the 2012 Summer Olympics
People from Suita
Cyclists at the 2010 Asian Games
Asian Games medalists in cycling
Medalists at the 2010 Asian Games
Asian Games bronze medalists for Japan
20th-century Japanese women
21st-century Japanese women